Andrei Kravchenko may refer to:

 Andrei Kravchenko (general) (1899–1963), Soviet general
 Andrei Krauchanka (born 1986), Belarusian decathlete
  (1912–1976), Soviet army officer and hero of the Soviet Union

See also
 Andriy Kravchenko (born 1980), Ukrainian racecar driver